Apheledes is a genus of beetles in the family Cerambycidae, containing the following species:

 Apheledes guttulatus Fairmaire, 1893
 Apheledes stigmatipennis (Fairmaire, 1887)

References

Dorcasominae